Ray Moujalli (born 20 December 1984) is a former Lebanon international rugby league footballer who most recently played for the Canterbury-Bankstown Bulldogs as a  in the NSW Cup competition.

Background
He was born in Sydney, Australia.

Playing career
Moujalli made his NRL debut in round 15 2009 for the Sydney Roosters, against the North Queensland Cowboys.

Between 2009 and 2015 Moujalli played over 100 games for Newtown.

Moujalli signed with Canterbury after six seasons with Newtown for the start of the 2017 Intrust Super Premiership season. At the beginning of the season he was announced as captain for the year.
. Moujalli represented Lebanon at The 2017 rugby league world cup.  Following the tournament, Moujalli retired as a professional rugby league footballer and now works as Canterbury's strength and conditioning coach.

References

External links
2017 RLWC profile

1984 births
Living people
Australian rugby league players
Australian people of Lebanese descent
Lebanon national rugby league team captains
Lebanon national rugby league team players
Newtown Jets NSW Cup players
Rugby league players from Sydney
Rugby league props
Sydney Roosters players